Herndon is an unincorporated community in Guthrie County, Iowa, United States.

History 
Herndon was laid out in 1881.

See also

Raccoon River Valley Trail
Krushchev in Iowa Trail

References 

Unincorporated communities in Iowa
Unincorporated communities in Guthrie County, Iowa
1881 establishments in Iowa